The Joint Staff Office (Japanese: 統合幕僚監部, Tōgō bakuryō-kanbu: abbreviation: JSO), also known as the Joint Staff, is one of the administrative agencies within the Government of Japan. It is a special organisation under the Japanese Ministry of Defense responsible for integrating the military operations of the Ground, Maritime and Air Self-Defense Forces. The abbreviation of the agency in Japanese is Tōbaku (統幕). 

The JSO is considered to be the equivalent of the Joint Chiefs of Staff of foreign armed forces, including that of the United States. Its predecessor was the Joint Chiefs Council (JSC). The office is located in Shinjuku Ward, Tokyo.

Organisation 
The JSO is divided into four departments as can be seen below. Each department has an associated code beginning with the letter J and a corresponding single-digit number. The Joint Staff also consists of four special staff (Joint Staff Councillor/Director General, Public Affairs Director General, Logistics and Legal Affairs General).

The current Chief of Staff, Joint Staff is General Koji Yamazaki. He has served in this position since 2019.

JSO internal structure:

 General Affairs Department (J-1)
 Operations Department (J-3)
 Defense Plans and Policy Department (J-5)
 C4 Systems Department (J-6)

Activities 
The JSO is responsible for coordinating the activities of the ground, maritime and air service branches of the Japan Self-Defense Forces. Duties of the Joint Staff also include as follows.

 Defense and security planning to smoothly execute the mission of the Joint Operation
 Development of an action plan
 Education and training, organisation, equipment procurement, deployment, accounting, acquisition, logistics, health and hygiene, human resource planning
 Development of a training plan
 Research and development for the efficient operation of the services needed
 Management and coordination of the forces to execute services in charge

Affiliated organisations 
Founded in 1961, the Joint Staff College is an affiliated school of the JSO and the Ministry of Defense.

References

External links 

 Joint Staff Office
 Joint Staff College
 Ministry of Defense (Japan)
 Japan Ground Self-Defense Force
 Japan Maritime Self-Defense Force
 Japan Air Self-Defense Force

Japan Self-Defense Forces